Poelchau is a surname. Notable people with the surname include:

 Dorothee Poelchau (1902–1977), German librarian and resistance fighter
  (1773–1836), German singer
 Harald Poelchau (1903–1972), German prison chaplain, religious socialist, and resistance fighter

German-language surnames